Transgression may refer to:

Legal, religious and social
Sin, a violation of God's Ten Commandments or other elements of God's moral law
Crime, legal transgression, usually created by a violation of social or economic boundary
In civil law jurisdictions, a transgression or a contravention is a smaller breach of law, similar to summary offence in common law jurisdictions
Social transgression, violating a social norm
Relational transgression – violation of implicit or explicit relational rules
Haram, going beyond Islamic religious restrictions

Science and mathematics
Transgression map in cohomology
Transgression (geology), a relative rise in sea level resulting in deposition of marine strata over terrestrial strata
Transgression (genetics) or Transgressive segregation, a peculiar case of heterosis, showing extreme phenotypes in a hybrid offspring

Literature
Transgressions, a 1997 novel by Sarah Dunant
Transgressions, a novel based in the English Civil War by Erastes
Transgressions: Volume Two, a short story collection by Stephen King and John Farris
Transgressive fiction, a literary style

Film, television, and music
Transgression (1931 film), a 1931 American film directed by Herbert Brenon
Transgression (1974 film), a 1974 South Korean film directed by Kim Ki-young
Transgression (2011 film), a 2011 film starring Michael Ironside, Maria Grazia Cucinotta, Jonathan Keltz, and Carlos Bardem
Transgression (2017 film), a 2017 Bulgarian film directed by Val Todorov
Cinema of Transgression, a film movement using shock value and humor
Transgression (album), 2005 release from industrial metal band Fear Factory

See also
Transgressive (disambiguation)